Ghonchi, also Ganchi, is a town and Jamoat in northern Tajikistan. It is the administrative center of Devashtich District, in the central part of Sughd Region. . The town has an estimated population of 17,000 (2020).

References

External links
Satellite map at Maplandia.com

Populated places in Sughd Region
Jamoats of Tajikistan